Cheeloo University (alternatively known as Shantung Christian College) was a university in China, established by Hunter Corbett American Presbyterian, and other English Baptist, Anglican, and Canadian Presbyterian mission agencies in early 1900 in China.

History

In 1864, the Yi Wen School Boys' School at Tengchow was established by Hunter Corbett, Presbyterian missionary to Yantai, Shandong, China.

In 1882, Calvin Wilson Mateer, an American Presbyterian, converted the Tengchow Boys' School into Tengchow College in Dengzhou (part of Penglai), Shandong, China. In 1884, British Baptists established Tsingchow Boy's Boarding School, a theological college, in Qingzhou, Shandong, China.

By 1902, the American Presbyterians and English Baptists agreed to combine their schools in Shandong, forming an arts college in Wei County (Weixian, now part of Weifang), a theological college at Qingzhoufu (part of Zibo), and a medical college, in Jinan. The campus in Wei County was known as the "Courtyard of the Happy Way" and was later used by the Japanese military as an internment camp for civilians during the Second World War.

In 1909, the colleges were consolidated as Shantung Protestant University (later changed to Shantung Christian University) in Jinan. The campus was designed by the Chicago architectural firm of Perkins, Fellows and Hamilton. The main buildings were Bergen Science Hall for Chemistry and Biology; Mateer Science Hall for Physics and Physiology, McCormick Hall for administration, and the Kumler Memorial Chapel in the center.

Construction began on Cheeloo Hospital of Shantung Christian University in 1914.  It was completed in 1936.

From 1916 to 1923, the former Peking Union Medical College, the Medical Department of Nanking University, the Hankow Medical College, and the North China Union Medical College for Women were all moved to Jinan. These departments were combined to form the co-educational Cheeloo University School of Medicine following the suggestion of the Dean of the Medical School at the time, Samuel Cochran. Dormitories and classes would first be opened to women in 1923. Eliza Ellen Leonard resigned as the first Dean of women in 1924 due to illness and died in the same year.

During the Second Sino-Japanese War from 1938 to 1945, the university joined five other universities to form West China Union University.

The university was dissolved in 1952 with the establishment of Communist rule. The College of Medicine was merged with the Shantung Provincial Medical College and the resulting Shandong Medical College occupied the entire campus. The College of Science was merged with the new National University in Nanjing while the College of Theology joined Nanking Theological Seminary. The College of Humanities was merged with Shandong University.

Support
During its existence, Cheeloo University received support from various sponsoring and cooperating organizations:

Sponsoring organizations:
American Presbyterian Missions, North
English Baptist Missionary Society
Church Missionary Society, England
Canadian Presbyterian Mission, later merged into United Church of Canada
Woman's Foreign Missionary Society of the United Church of Canada
Woman's Foreign Missionary Society of the Methodist Episcopal Church
American Board of Commissioners for Foreign Missions
Society for the Propagation of the Gospel in Foreign Parts

Cooperating organizations:
English Presbyterian Mission
Harvard-Yenching Institute
Rockefeller Foundation
Salt Merchants of Jinan

Presidents
 Paul D. Bergen (1904–1915)
 J. Percy Bruce (1916–1920)
 Harold Balme (1921–1927)
 Li Tianlu (李天祿, 1927–1929)
 Zhū Jīngnóng　(朱經農, 1931-1933)
 Liú Shūmíng (刘書銘, 1935-1943)
 Edgar Chi-ho Tang (湯吉禾, 1943-1945)　
 Wú Kèmíng (吴克銘, 1945-1949)
 David Yang (楊德齋, 1949–1952)

Notable alumni and faculty
Edgar Tang, university president
B.A. Garside, professor of education
Lao She (Chinese: 老舍; pinyin: Lǎo Shě),
Henry Winters Luce, father of Henry R. Luce
Helena Rosa Wright, pioneer in birth control and family planning
Ernest Black Struthers, Professor and Dean of the Faculty of Medicine

See also
Shandong University

References

External links
 http://www.library.yale.edu/div/colleges/descriptions.htm#shantung

 
C
Shandong University
History of Shandong
Educational institutions established in 1864
1952 disestablishments in China
1864 establishments in China